Steven Bryan Gordon (born 16 May 1967) is a former New Zealand rugby union player. He was a member of the New Zealand national side, the All Blacks, from 1989 to 1993 and played 19 matches for the team including two internationals.

References

1967 births
Living people
People from Te Awamutu
New Zealand rugby union players
New Zealand international rugby union players
Rugby union locks
Waikato rugby union players
Wellington rugby union players
Chiefs (rugby union) players
Highlanders (rugby union) players
Rugby union players from Waikato
People educated at Te Awamutu College